Dalma Ružičić-Benedek (born 21 February 1982) is a Hungarian-born Serbian sprint canoer who has competed since 2003. She won twelve medals at the ICF Canoe Sprint World Championships with seven golds, three silvers and two bronzes.

Career in Serbia
In late 2012, after failing to qualify for her third consecutive Olympic Games, Dalma Ružičić-Benedek decided to compete for Serbia, country of her husband, former canoer Dušan Ružičić who is also her personal coach. She made her debut for Serbia in the first stage of the 2013 World Cup in Szeged, when she won the gold medal in the K-1 500m. At the 2013 European Championship she won two gold medals at distances of 500m and 1000m. Ružičić-Benedek won her first World Championship medal for Serbia in 2014, bronze in K-1 1000m.

References

External links

 
 
 
 
 

1982 births
Living people
Canoeists from Budapest
Hungarian female canoeists
Serbian female canoeists
Naturalized citizens of Serbia
ICF Canoe Sprint World Championships medalists in kayak
European Games medalists in canoeing
European Games gold medalists for Serbia
Canoeists at the 2015 European Games
Canoeists at the 2016 Summer Olympics
Olympic canoeists of Serbia
European champions for Serbia